Jiangxinzhou station, is a station of Line 10 of the Nanjing Metro. It started operations on 1 July 2014.

References

Railway stations in Jiangsu
Railway stations in China opened in 2014
Nanjing Metro stations